Sea Life Busan Aquarium is an aquarium located in Haeundae Beach, South Korea.

Description
There are about 250 species and up to 35,000 marine animals on display. The main tank contains  of water, and the animals can be viewed through acrylic windows or from the  underwater tunnel. There are 40 exhibits, which include penguins, otters, piranha, sea jellies and a touch tank for a close up "hands on" look at a variety of sea creatures.

Ownership
Busan Aquarium is a joint project between Living and Leisure Australia (LLA) and local government. This is the first major tourism undertaking with a local government under the Private Investment Promotion of Infrastructure Law. 

Living and Leisure Australia has since been acquired by Merlin Entertainments, the world's second largest attraction operator. The LLA Group has extensive experience in aquarium operations and owns four other aquariums: UnderWater World, Queensland, Melbourne Aquarium, Siam Ocean World, and Chang Feng Ocean World, Shanghai. It also manages the Dubai Aquarium and Under Water Zoo under a management contract from the United Arab Emirates.

Since February 5, 2010, Busan Aquarium has formed a sister building tie-up with Aqua World.

Busan Aquarium has been rebranded as Sea Life Busan Aquarium as of 1 July 2014.

See also
List of South Korean tourist attractions

References

External links
 

Sea Life Centres
Buildings and structures in Busan
Tourist attractions in Busan
Aquaria in South Korea